Tver Karelians are a people who inhabit regions of Tver, Saint Petersburg, and Moscow. Their dialect is remarkable in that it does not borrow from other Balto-Finnic languages due to centuries of geographical isolation. Although the number of Tver Karelian people was about 14,633 in 2002, very few (about 25 in one census) named the dialect as their primary language. The number of Tver Karelians was 7,394 in 2010 and 2,764 in 2020.

Origins
There are two complementary theories as to the origin of the Tver Karelians.

Resettlement theory
Tver Karelians may have migrated from their homeland, the Karelian Isthmus, to the Tver region by a process of resettlement. The beginning of migration followed the Treaty of Stolbovo in 1617, at the conclusion of the Ingrian war where Russia was defeated by Sweden. Peak migration, in the tens of thousands (25,000 to 30,000), occurred between the 1640s and 1660s. Under Swedish rule, residents of Ingria and Swedish Karelia were forced to convert from the Orthodox religion to Lutheranism. This together with famine and disease led to an exodus.

Ethnic sub-group theory
Smaller Karelian groups who were native to the Tikhvin and Valdai regions may have assimilated with the migrant groups.

History
In 1926, the Tver Karelian numbered about 140,567. 95% identified Karelian as their mother tongue. Between 1937 and 1939, the Karelian National Okrug was recognised with its centre in Likhoslavl. Since 1997, the Tver Karelian have had national and cultural autonomy.

Decrease in national identity
Decreases in Tver Karelian national identity in the twentieth century may be associated with factors such as loss of religion to atheism; loss of native language; and loss of the inter-generational passage of cultural knowledge such as "Babkin tradition" (traditional craftsmanship). In the 1950s, the Soviet Union experienced a mass migration from rural to urban regions. This affected the Tver Karelians as many of the population were farmers and or resident in rural areas. Because of such predominantly rural residence, the term "Karelian" might in some circumstances colloquially equate to "Country bumpkin".

Changes in the Tver Karelian population over time

* In the USSR

** in the Tver region

Language

In contrast to other languages and dialects, the Tver Karelian language continues in its archaic form. Most probably, it is close to a Karelian proto-language. Vocabulary of Tver dialect was influenced by and borrowed from the language of the medieval Egonskoy villages (which no longer exist). Reliable information about the origin of writing of the Tver Karelian language is not available. By 1930, Karelian was commonly written in Cyrillic and or the Latin script.

References

External links
 http://www.gov.karelia.ru/gov/index_e.html

Ethnic groups in Russia
Baltic Finns
Indigenous peoples of Europe
Karelia
Karelian people